Kollam/Quilon Syrian copper plates, also known as Kollam Tarisappalli copper plates, or Kottayam inscription of Sthanu Ravi, or Tabula Quilonensis record a royal grant issued by the chieftain of Kollam (Ayyan Adikal) to a Syrian Christian merchant magnate (Mar Sapir Iso) in Kerala. The royal charter is engraved in old Malayalam in Vattezhuthu (with some Grantha characters) on six copper plates. The document is the oldest available Chera Perumal inscription. 

The charter is dated to the 5th regnal year of the Chera Perumal ruler Sthanu Ravi Kulasekhara (849/50 AD). The sixth plate contains a number of signatures of the witnesses to the grant in Arabic (Kufic script), Middle Persian (cursive Pahlavi script) and Judeo-Persian (standard square Hebrew script). Until 2013 it was believed that the six plates formed two separate grants (dated separately) issued by Kerala rulers to the Syrian Christian merchants.

One part (four plates) of the copper plates is kept at the Devalokam Aramana of the Malankara Orthodox Syrian Church while the other (two small plates) is at Poolatheen Aramana (Thiruvalla) of Malankara Marthoma Syrian Church. The copper plate also mentions about the Jews and Muslims of Kerala in the Arabic (Kufic script), Middle Persian (cursive Pahlavi script) and Judeo-Persian (standard square Hebrew script) parts.

Summarised prescription 

The grant is dated the 5th regnal year of king Sthanu Ravi, 849-50 AD (old Malayalam: Ko Tanu Ravi). It was drafted in the presence of Chera Perumal prince Vijayaraga, Venad chieftain Ayyan Adikal Thiruvadikal, junior chieftain Rama Thiruvadikal, other important officers of the chiefdom (the adhikarar, the prakrithi, the punnathala padi, and the pulakkudi padi) and the representatives of merchant guilds anjuvannam and manigramam. 

The charter grants land to Mar Sapir Iso, the founder the Kollam trading city (the nagara), to build the Church of Tarisa at Kollam. The land, evidently a large settlement with its occupants, is donated as an "attipperu" by Ayyan Adikal.  Sapir Iso also recruited two merchant guilds (the anjuvannam and the manigramam) as the tenants of the nagara (the karanmai). The Six Hundred of Venad, the Nair militia of the chiefdom, was entrusted with the protection of the nagara and the church. The charter also granted serfs to the nagara and the church. This included personnel like agricultural laborers (the vellalars), carpenters (the thachar), toddy tappers (the ezhavar) and salt-makers (the eruviyar). 

The charter granted Sapir Iso several titles, rights and aristocratic privileges.  All revenues from the donated land and its occupants were 'exempted' (which perhaps meant that these were to be made over to the church).

Witnesses to grant 
The vertical plate contains a number of signatures of the witnesses to the grant in Arabic (Kufic script), Middle Persian (cursive Pahlavi script) and Judeo-Persian (standard square Hebrew script).

Arabic signatures ― Kufic script

 Maymun, son of Ibrahim
 Muhammad, son of Manih
 Sulh, son of Ali
 Uthman, son of al-Marzuban
 Muhammad, son of Yahya
 Amr, son of Ibrahm
 Ibrahim, son of al-Tayy
 Bakr, son of Mansur
 al-Qasim, son of Hamid
 Mansur, son of Isa
 Ismail, son of Yaqub

Middle Persian signatures ― Pahlavi script

 Farrox, son of Narseh, son of Sahraban
 Yōhanan, son of Mašya, son of Wehzād
 Šāhdōst, son of Mardweh, son of Farroxīg
 Sēnmihr, son of Bayweh
 Sīnā, son of Yākub
 [...], son of Mardweh
 Marōē, son of Yōhanan
 Farrbay, son of Windād-Ohrmazd
 Mard-Farrox, son of Bōyšād
 Āzādmard, son of Ahlā

Judeo-Persian signatures ― Hebrew script

 Hasan Ali
 Sahaq
 Samael 
 Abraham Quwami 
 Kurus Yahiya

Mention of Thomas of Cana 

Thomas of Cana copper plates dated between the mid 4th and early 9th century are a lost set of copper-plate grants issued by an unidentified Chera Perumal king to the Christian merchants in the city of "Makotayar Pattinam" (present day Kodungallur). Translations of the Quilon plates made by the Syrian Christian priest Ittimani in 1601 as well as the French scholar A. H. Anquetil-Duperron in 1758 both note that one of the Quilon plates mentioned a brief of the arrival of Thomas of Cana. However, the presently available Quilon plates do not mention this episode. It is generally assumed that this was a notation of the previous rights bestowed upon the Christians by the Chera king (and the abovesaid plate was missing).

Translation by A. H. A. Duperron (1758): 

“The history of the founding of the town of Cranganore when Pattanam was the City, (he) visited, revered and requested the Emperor and the Minister at Kolla Kodungalloor for a marsh where thickets grow. Measured by Anakol (elephant kol) 4,444 kols of land was granted in the year of the Jupiter in Kubham, on the 29th of Makaram, 31 the Saturday, Rohini and Saptami (7th day of the moon),' the palace, great temple and school at Irinjalakuda also were founded. The same day that place was called Makothevar pattanam (the town of the Great God), and it was made the city (capital). From there privileges such as drawbridge at gates, ornamented arches, mounted horse with two drums, cheers, conch blowing, salutes were granted in writing to the Christian foreigner called Kynai Thomma with sacred threat and libation of water and flower. The sun and the moon are witnesses to this. Written to the kings of all times.”

Re-engraved plates 
Some recent studies suggest that the original text of the Thomas of Cana plates once might have been part of the Quilon plates collection. Scholar István Perczel theorizes that at one time the Quilon plates and the Thomas of Cana plates, or parts of them, were re-engraved together (and thus the text of both grants were present on a single set of plates).

See also

 Jewish copper plates of Cochin
 Thomas of Cana copper plates

References

Works cited

Further reading
 Veluthat, Kesavan, 2009. The Early Medieval in South India. Delhi: Oxford University Press. 

9th-century inscriptions
Tharisapalli Plates
Vatteluttu
Tharisapalli Plates
9th century in law
849
Saint Thomas Christians
Chera dynasty
Kerala history inscriptions